The 3rd Women's World Chess Championship took place during the 4th Chess Olympiad in Prague between 12-26 July 1931. The tournament was played as a double round-robin tournament. Vera Menchik successfully defended her title. The final results were as follows:

{| class="wikitable"
! # !!Player !! 1 !! 2 !! 3 !! 4 !! 5 !! Total
|- style="background:#ccffcc;"
| style="background:gold;"|1 ||  || - || 1 1 || 1 1 || 1 1 || 1 1 || 8
|-
| style="background:silver;"|2 ||  || 0 0 || - || 0 1 || 0 1 || 1 1 || 4
|-
| style="background:#cc9966;"|3 ||  || 0 0 || 1 0 || - || 1 ½ || 1 0 || 3½
|-
| 4 ||  || 0 0 || 1 0 || 0 ½ || - || 1 0 || 2½
|-
| 5 ||  || 0 0 || 0 0 || 0 1 || 0 1 || - || 2
|}

References 

Women's World Chess Championships
1931 in chess
Sports competitions in Prague
Chess in Czechoslovakia
1930s in Prague
July 1931 sports events
1931 in women's sport